William Leonardo Guerrero Prins (born 6 September 1990) is a Colombian professional footballer.

Club career

Sonsonate
Guerrero signed with Sonsonate in the Apertura 2015 tournament. He continued on the team for the Clausura 2016 and left the club after the tournament ended.

UES
Guerrero signed with UES in the Apertura 2016 tournament. He left the club after the tournament ended.

Once Municipal
In 2017 he signed with Once Municipal.

Platense
Guerrero signed with Platense in the Apertura 2018 of Segunda División. In November 2018, Guerrero scored an Olympic goal against Santa Rosa Guachipilin in a 3–1 victory.

References

1990 births
Living people
Colombian footballers
Barranquilla F.C. footballers
C.D. Chalatenango footballers
Colombian expatriate footballers
Expatriate footballers in El Salvador
Association football midfielders